Michael Joseph Crane (September 8, 1863 – December 26, 1928) was an American prelate of the Roman Catholic Church. He served as auxiliary bishop of the Archdiocese of Philadelphia from 1921 until his death in 1928.

Biography
Michael Crane was born in Ashland, Pennsylvania, and studied at St. Charles Borromeo Seminary in Overbrook. He continued his studies at the Catholic University of America in Washington, D.C., where he earned a Bachelor of Sacred Theology degree in 1890. He was ordained to the priesthood by Archbishop Patrick John Ryan on June 15, 1889.

He served as a curate at a parish in Reading and later at St. Malachy Church in Philadelphia. In 1903, he became rector of St. Francis de Sales Church, also in Philadelphia. He was named a papal chamberlain in 1914, and became vicar general of the Archdiocese of Philadelphia in 1920.

On August 20, 1921, Crane was appointed auxiliary bishop of Philadelphia and titular bishop of Curium by Pope Benedict XV. He received his episcopal consecration on the following September 19 from Cardinal Dennis Joseph Dougherty, with Bishops John Joseph McCort and Thomas Walsh serving as co-consecrators. As an auxiliary bishop, he continued to serve as pastor of St. Francis de Sales.

He died from pneumonia at the rectory of St. Francis de Sales, at age 65.

References

1863 births
1928 deaths
Clergy from Philadelphia
20th-century Roman Catholic bishops in the United States
St. Charles Borromeo Seminary alumni
Catholic University of America alumni
People from Ashland, Pennsylvania
Catholics from Pennsylvania